Balarama Holness (born July 20, 1983), also known as Steven Holness, is a politician and former Canadian football safety. He was originally signed by the Winnipeg Blue Bombers as an undrafted free agent in 2008. He won a Grey Cup Championship with the Montreal Alouettes in 2010. He played CIS Football at Ottawa.

While studying law at McGill University, he ran for borough mayor of Montréal-Nord for Projet Montréal in the 2017 Montreal municipal election but lost to Christine Black. After the 2017 election, Holness launched a petition calling for the city to hold a public consultation on systemic racism and discrimination. Founder of a social justice lobby group "Montreal in Action," Holness was profiled on November 21, 2020, by the CTV Television Network as "an inspirational view of a man confronting systemic racism."

On May 20, 2021, he announced his candidacy for mayor of Montreal in the 2021 Montreal municipal election as a candidate of the Mouvement Montréal party. Holness finished in third place with 7.23% of votes and Mouvement Montréal failed to elect any of its candidates.

On June 7, 2022, Holness announced the creation of party Bloc Montreal, being a part of the 2022 Quebec general election. Bloc Montreal finished with only 0.2% of votes and it failed to elect any of its candidates, including Holness himself.

Andrew Michael Holness, the current Prime Minister of Jamaica is his first cousin. Balarama's mother is a French-speaking Quebecer from Montreal. His daughter is named after Marie-Joseph Angélique, a Portuguese-born black slave in New France.

Election Results 

Source: Global News

References

External links 
Montreal Alouettes bio
Official website

1983 births
Anglophone Quebec people
Canadian football defensive backs
French Quebecers
Living people
Montreal Alouettes players
Ottawa Gee-Gees football players
Players of Canadian football from Quebec
Politicians from Montreal
Canadian football people from Montreal
Winnipeg Blue Bombers players
Canadian sportsperson-politicians
Black Canadian players of Canadian football
Black Canadian politicians